Little Eye can refer to:

 Little Eye (band), a Scottish pop/rock band
 Little Eye, a small British island located next to Hilbre Island

See also
 I spy, a guessing game involving the phrase, "I spy with my little eye..."
 "Little Eyes", a folk song